Short Circuit (Italian: Cortocircuito) is a 1943 Italian thriller film directed by Giacomo Gentilomo and starring Vivi Gioi, Umberto Melnati and Guglielmo Barnabò. The film was made at the Pisorno Studios in Tirrenia. It is one of several films considered as a possible precursor to the giallo genre.

Plot

Cast 
 Vivi Gioi as Cristina Redy  
 Umberto Melnati as Ugo Redy, suo marito  
 Guglielmo Barnabò as Il gionalista Saverio Funk 
 Bianca Doria as Eva Fredy  
 Lauro Gazzolo as L'editore Isidoro Storch  
 Gilda Marchiò as La signora Ipanoff 
 Giacomo Moschini as Il commissario Plunk  
 Egisto Olivieri as Il professore Ermanno Heker  
 Gualtiero Isnenghi as Il dottor Besson  
 Mario Besesti as Gruner, l'aiuntante del commissario  
 Enzo Biliotti as Il barone Von Springher  
 Dina Perbellini as La contessa
 Mirka Bereny as L'infermiera 
 Dino Di Luca as Il primo giocatore di scacchi  
 Gerardo Frossi as Un domestico della clinica 
 Luisa Garella as La direttrice della casa editrice "Centauro" 
 Fausto Guerzoni as Il secondo giocatore di scacchi  
 Guido Notari as Il professore Muller 
 Giuseppe Pierozzi as Il commendatore nella clinica

References

Bibliography 
 Moliterno, Gino. A to Z of Italian Cinema. Scarecrow Press, 2009.

External links 
 

1940s thriller films
1943 films
Italian black-and-white films
Italian thriller films
1940s Italian-language films
Films directed by Giacomo Gentilomo
Films shot at Tirrenia Studios
1940s Italian films